Moulay Brahim Boutayeb (born 15 August 1967 in Khemisset) is a retired Moroccan track and field athlete. He was the winner of the 10,000 m race at the 1988 Summer Olympics.

Career
Boutayeb was born in Khemisset, Morocco. Although he had been considered more a 5000 m runner before 1988, he was quite unknown until the Seoul Olympics.

The 10,000 m final at Seoul was started at a very fast pace, pushed along mostly by Kenyans, Kipkemboi Kimeli, and Moses Tanui. A small lead group reached the halfway mark at world record pace, at which point Boutayeb moved to lead. He continued the race at world record pace, but deliberately slowed after the bell to finish in a world's fourth fastest time of 27:21.46.

After the Olympic Games,  Boutayeb decided to concentrate again on shorter distances, running his personal bests in distances from 1500 m to 5000 m over the next couple of seasons. He placed second in the season rankings for the 1988 IAAF Grand Prix Final. He won a bronze medal in 5000 m at the 1991 World Championships held in Tokyo. At the Barcelona Olympic Games, Boutayeb came fourth in 5000 m, only 0.75 seconds behind the winner Dieter Baumann from Germany.

After being eliminated in his heat of the 5000 m at the 1993 World Championships in Stuttgart, Brahim Boutayeb retired from competitive athletics and preferred to concentrate on his new sporting interest as a rally driver.

References

External links 

 
 

1967 births
Living people
People from Khemisset
Moroccan male long-distance runners
Olympic male long-distance runners
Olympic athletes of Morocco
Olympic gold medalists for Morocco
Olympic gold medalists in athletics (track and field)
Athletes (track and field) at the 1988 Summer Olympics
Athletes (track and field) at the 1992 Summer Olympics
Medalists at the 1988 Summer Olympics
Mediterranean Games gold medalists for Morocco
Mediterranean Games medalists in athletics
Athletes (track and field) at the 1991 Mediterranean Games
World Athletics Championships athletes for Morocco
World Athletics Championships medalists
African Championships in Athletics winners
Japan Championships in Athletics winners
20th-century Moroccan people
21st-century Moroccan people